Ajo Qaghan, also Are Qaghan, was a Khagan of Yenisei Kyrgyz Khaganate in 795–847.

Etymology 
The Kyrgyz ruler was called «Aje» (Ajo). Modern transcription is the form «Aje». Judging by Tang sources, Aje is both the title and the clan name of the ruling house of the Kyrgyz in the 8th-9th centuries. As Vasily Bartold writes, the title is mentioned only in Tang sources. In the modern Kyrgyz language, there is the word «Aжоо», which means Leader.

Life 
There is no information about Ajo's early life. In 820, he declared himself a Khagan, his mother, née Turgesh, widow Khatun, the wife of the Karluk people, Khatun thereby declaring war on the Uyghur Khaganate.

The war dragged on for 20 long years. As the military luck came to the side of the Kyrgyz, Ajo, puffed up by victories, directed the famous message to the Uyghur Khagan, which perfectly characterizes the style of Kyrgyz diplomacy of the "epoch of great power"

In every phrase of this message sounds the triumph of the winner. Military failures increased the instability of power in Uyghur Khaganate. As a result of another civil strife, in 840 the Uyghur commander Poylu Mohe went over to the side of the Kyrgyz with his army. The road to the Uyghur capital was open. The Uyghur army was defeated, the capital Ordu-Baliq was taken, the Qasar Qaghan died. The Kyrgyz captured his Khatun, the Chinese princess Taihe from the Tang dynasty.

In an effort to establish diplomatic contacts with the Tang dynasty, the Kyrgyz Khagan sent Princess Taihe, accompanied by a military escort led by Dului Shihe, to China. He claimed the former privileges of the Uyghurs. However, the Uyghur Khagan Wujie se intercepted the Kyrgyz detachment and captured the princess. The Kyrgyz Khagan, having no information about the fate of the princess, sent a military detachment to search for her, and sent an embassy to China led by Alp Sol Tepek with a letter in which he was interested in the fate of Taihe.

Emperor Wuzong wrote to Ajo Qaghan the following:

From 840 to 847, the Kyrgyz troops conducted successful campaigns in East Turkestan, Mongolia, Jeti-Suu, China, Transbaikalia and Manchuria.

In 842–843, the Kyrgyz troops captured the cities of Beshbaliq, Kuqa, Karasahr, Turpan, Beiting and Anxi. The Tatars were conquered, and a successful devastating campaign was carried out in Gansu. However, Ajo did not lead these campaigns, almost all campaigns were led by the Kyrgyz Tarkhan Alp Sol Tepek.

Despite their interest in an alliance with the Kyrgyz, the Chinese feared their real strengthening. Therefore, they urged not to accept the conquered Uyghurs, but to destroy them. General opinion officials was that «to eliminate future disturbances, there is no reason to strengthen the Khyagas». Kyrgyz Khagan, conqueror of the Uyghurs, died in 847.

Death and family
In 847, Ajo Qaghan died, farewell gifts were sent from the Tang dynasty, and his successor, Yingwu Qaghan, continued the conquests of his predecessor.

Issue:
 Yingwu Qaghan
 Alp Sol Tepek

References 

847 deaths
9th-century monarchs in Asia
Year of birth unknown
9th-century Turkic people
History of Kyrgyzstan
Turkic rulers